César Hanna Halum (born 10 March 1954) is a Brazilian politician as well as a lawyer. Although born in Goiás, he has spent his political career representing the state of Tocantins, having served as state representative from 2011 to 2019.

Personal life
Halum is the son of Geny Elias Halum and Nahim Hanna Halum. He is an alumnus of the Federal University of Goiás. Halum is married to Grácia Maria Teixeira with whom he has three children: Flávia, Fernanda and César Henrique. Before becoming a politician he worked as a veterinarian.

Political career
Halum voted in favor of the impeachment of then-president Dilma Rousseff. He voted in favor of the 2017 Brazilian labor reform, and would vote in favor of a corruption investigation into Rousseff's successor Michel Temer.

After failing to be reelected to a third term in the chamber of deputies in the 2018 election, Halum was appointed the secretary of agriculture, livestock and aquaculture for the state of Tocantins. In March 2019, Halum represented Tocantins at an international conference in Lima, Peru, on sustainable agricultural production.

References

1954 births
Living people
People from Anápolis
Brazilian veterinarians
Federal University of Goiás alumni
Republicans (Brazil) politicians
Social Democratic Party (Brazil, 2011) politicians
Cidadania politicians
Democrats (Brazil) politicians
Liberal Front Party (Brazil) politicians
Members of the Chamber of Deputies (Brazil) from Tocantins
Members of the Legislative Assembly of Tocantins
Mayors of places in Brazil